Charles Gitonga (born 5 October 1971) is a retired athlete from Kenya who specialized in the 400 metres. He is best known for winning the gold medal at the 1994 Commonwealth Games in Victoria.

His personal best time was 44.20 seconds, achieved in June 1996 in Nairobi. The result gives him a 19th place on the world all-time performers list, and is only 0.02 seconds behind the Kenyan record set by Samson Kitur four years earlier.

External links
 
 
 

1971 births
Living people
Kenyan male sprinters
Athletes (track and field) at the 1996 Summer Olympics
Athletes (track and field) at the 1994 Commonwealth Games
Commonwealth Games gold medallists for Kenya
Olympic athletes of Kenya
Commonwealth Games medallists in athletics
People from Nyeri County
Medallists at the 1994 Commonwealth Games